Liu Chenxiang is a mythical hero and demigod in the Chinese folktale The Magic Lotus Lantern. At the top of the Western Peak of Mount Hua, there is a historic giant stone which is a hundred feet high, called Axe-splitting Rock, that has been cut neatly into three parts. Legend has it that it was cut by Chen Xiang to split the mountain in order to save his mother, who was trapped within it.

Legend 
According to the Tang dynasty folk tale The Magic Lotus Lantern, his mother, Huayue Sanniang, a goddess in the Heavenly Palace, fell in love with a mortal scholar, Liu Yanchang. Their love was strongly opposed by her elder brother, Erlang Shen. With the help of the magic lotus lantern, the goddess defeated her brother and married the scholar. Later, she gave birth to her son, Chen Xiang.

After seven years, Erlang Shen was able to locate the couple by the light of the magical lotus lantern. He then denies the marriage and captures Chen Xiang. After Erlang Sheng took the lantern from Huayue Sanniang, he releases Chen Xiang. However, he pushed Huayue Sanniang down under the giant stone at the top of the Western Peak of Mount Hua.

After nine years, Chen Xiang had gradually grown up into a thoughtful young man. One day, he learns of how his mother was imprisoned and determines to go to Mount Hua to rescue his mother. Chen Xiang encounters many trials during his journey. He learned martial arts skills from the Monkey King. His teacher varies depending on the preference of the storyteller including Monkey King, Lü Dongbin, He Xiangu, Li Tieguai, Taibai Jinxing, Pili Daxian and Shen Gongbao. He impressed the Monkey King, so he made a powerful weapon called Mountain-Opening Axe. He fought Erlang Shen with the axe, and just as Erlang Shen was ready to kill Chen Xiang, the lotus lantern's light penetrated Chen Xiang's body and merged with him, and he was able to defeat Erlang Shen.

After he defeated his uncle, Chen Xiang split open Mount Hua with his magical axe and rescued his mother, reuniting his family.

Influence

Films
 Save Mother from Mountain (小英雄劈山救母), a 1928 Chinese film
 Breaking Open the Mountain to Rescue Mother (劈山救母), a 1950 Hong Kong film
 The Precious Lotus Lamp (寶蓮燈), a 1956 Hong Kong Cantonese opera film
 The Precious Lotus Lamp, Part II (1957)
 The Precious Lotus Lamp, Part III (1958)
 The Magic Lotus Lantern (寶蓮燈), a 1959 Chinese film
 Breaking Open the Mountain to Rescue Mother (劈山救母), a 1961 Taiwanese film
 The Lotus Lamp (七彩寶蓮燈), a 1963 Hong Kong Cantonese opera film
 The Magic Lamp (寶蓮燈), a 1964 Hong Kong Huangmei opera film
 The Lotus Lamp (寶蓮燈), a 1965 Hong Kong film
 The Magic Lotus Lantern (寶蓮燈), a 1976 Hebei bangzi film

Animation films
Saving Mother (西嶽奇童), a 1984 Chinese film
Lotus Lantern, a 1999 Chinese film
Chen Xiang (西嶽奇童), a 2006 Chinese film
New Gods: Yang Jian,  a popular Chinese animation

TV series
The Lamp Lore (寶蓮燈), a 1986 Hong Kong TV series
The Polien Lantern (天地傳說之寶蓮燈), a 2001 Chinese-Taiwanese TV series
Lotus Lantern, a 2005 Chinese TV series
Prelude of Lotus Lantern (2009)

References

Chinese deities
Chinese gods
Heroes in mythology and legend